Jan Mauersberger (born 17 June 1985) is a retired German footballer who played as a defender.

Mauersberger retired at the end of the 2018/19 season.

Career statistics

References

External links

1985 births
Living people
German footballers
Germany youth international footballers
FC Bayern Munich II players
SpVgg Greuther Fürth players
VfL Osnabrück players
Karlsruher SC players
Footballers from Munich
Association football defenders
2. Bundesliga players
3. Liga players
TSV 1860 Munich players